"Feels Like Tonight" is the fourth main single (sixth overall) from American rock band Daughtry's debut album. The song is a power ballad in the vein of the band's previous hit, "Home". The official release date for the track in the U.S. was January 8, 2008.

Background
Shortly after releasing the band's first compilation album It's Not Over...The Hits So Far, frontman Chris Daughtry spoke with Entertainment Weekly about his original distaste for the song and eventual acceptance, saying Max Martin and Dr. Luke had written this song and it was actually one of two songs that I’ve recorded that I didn’t write anything on. I didn’t work with those guys. I remember it being very close to the end of the record making process [for 2006’s self-titled debut] and I remember getting this song and I was like, 'No, no, I’m not cutting it, it’s way too pop. It’s so not with the rest of the record.' I was really being a bull about it. I remember being told, 'This was the song that they wrote for you had you won the show.' And I was like, 'Well now I definitely don’t want to do it!' Anyway, I appeased them and I recorded it and then I remember hearing it back and going 'OK, you were right, this was definitely a good idea.' And it became one of our bigger songs. I still don’t know what it means.

Music video
The music video was shot under director Martin Weisz. The video debuted Monday, January 14, 2008 on Amazon.com.

The video begins with the band playing in a barren desert in the daytime. When the first chorus starts, clouds are shown racing by and it suddenly changes to nighttime. After the end of the chorus the clouds clear and it is daytime again, however the band is now playing in a forest setting. When the chorus starts for the second time, it again becomes night and Chris is shown walking out of the forest through a door. When he emerges the band is waiting for him on a city rooftop, it being daytime. Upon the third and final chorus, it once again becomes night and the band is shown playing on the rooftop with the lit up skyscrapers of the city behind them.

In popular culture

The song was used for WWE's annual Tribute to the Troops special in 2007.

It was originally planned to be the end credits song to National Treasure: Book of Secrets but was cut at the last minute.

The instrumental version of the song is played in the commercials for the film Charlie Wilson's War.

The song appeared in the January 28, 2008 episode of the seventh season of American Idol.

TV5 used the song during the 5 Max Movies' commercial breaks in 2008 and 2009.

The song was featured in promotional commercials in Spring 2009 for ABC soap operas One Life to Live and General Hospital.

Track listing
Germany CD single  
"Feels Like Tonight" (Main Version) - 3:58
"Feels Like Tonight" (Video) - 3:58

Special Edition
"Feels Like Tonight" (Main Version) - 3:58
"Feels Like Tonight" (Video) - 3:58
"Feels Like the First Time" (Foreigner cover) - 3:24

Chart performance
In its first week of release, it was the most added track at both Mainstream Top 40 and Hot AC radio. The following week it debuted at number 89 on the Hot 100, and peaked at number 24, giving the band their fourth top forty Hot 100 hit from the album. It debuted on the Billboard Pop 100 at number 99, peaking at number seventeen, and the Adult Top 40 at number 29, where it has reached number one, becoming the band's third number one and fourth top five hit on that chart. This made Daughtry the first band to have four top five hits on the Adult Top 40 from their debut album. On the Hot Adult Contemporary Chart, the song reached number five, giving the band their second top ten on the chart. It debuted on the Canadian Hot 100 at number 67, peaking at number 30.

Weekly charts

Year end charts

Release history

References

2006 songs
2008 singles
Daughtry (band) songs
Music videos directed by Martin Weisz
Rock ballads
Songs written by Max Martin
Songs written by Dr. Luke
Songs written by Sheppard Solomon
Song recordings produced by Howard Benson